Américo Gregorio Martín Estaba (1 February 1938 – 17 February 2022) was a Venezuelan politician. A member of A New Era, he served in the Venezuelan Chamber of Deputies from 1979 to 1984. He died in Caracas on 17 February 2022, at the age of 84.

References

1938 births
2022 deaths
A New Era politicians
Venezuelan politicians
20th-century Venezuelan lawyers
Venezuelan writers
Venezuelan guerrillas
Members of the Venezuelan Chamber of Deputies
Politicians from Caracas